Velika Gora is a settlement (naselje) in the Sveti Ivan Zelina administrative territory of Zagreb County, Croatia. As of 2011 it had a population of 82 people.

References

Populated places in Zagreb County